Holyhead School is a mixed secondary school and sixth form located in the Handsworth area of Birmingham, in the West Midlands of England.

Previously a foundation school administered by Birmingham City Council, Holyhead School converted to academy status in August 2011. The school became part of the RSA Academies Trust in September 2014, but continues to coordinate with Birmingham City Council for admissions for its Year 7 intake.

In 2014, the school was described as "outstanding" by Ofsted, which stated that "achievement in mathematics has been consistently outstanding". The school's continuing achievements in Mathematics had also recently been further recognised when the department had been nominated for the "TES Maths department of the Year 2015/16" award.

Holyhead School offers GCSEs and BTECs as programmes of study for pupils, while students in the sixth form have the option to study from a range of A-levels and further BTECs.

In January 2017, long standing principal Martin Bayliss and colleague Amanda Cottam retired after 17 and 38 years teaching at the school respectively. After a long recruitment process, it was decided that the then Head of Key Stage 3, Ross Trafford, would be promoted to the role.

References

External links
Holyhead School official website

Secondary schools in Birmingham, West Midlands
Academies in Birmingham, West Midlands